Honour or Honor is a surname.

Notable people with the name Honour include:

 Brian Honour (born 1964), English footballer and manager
 George Honour (1918–2002), British submariner
 Hugh Honour (born 1927), British art historian
 Janet Honour (born 1950), English athlete
 Vic Honour (1910–2001), Australian cricketer

Notable people with the name Honor include:

 Gareth Honor (born 1979), English rugby player

English-language surnames